Scrobipalpa smithi is a moth in the family Gelechiidae. It was described by Povolný and Bradley in 1965. It is found in Algeria, Spain, Ukraine, Turkey, Syria, Lebanon, China (Xinjiang) and Mongolia.

References

Scrobipalpa
Moths described in 1965